Carl Rolf Ekéus (born 7 July 1935) is a Swedish diplomat.  From 1978 to 1983, he was a representative to the Conference on Disarmament in Geneva, and he has worked on various other disarmament committees and commissions.

Between 1991 and 1997 he was director of the United Nations Special Commission on Iraq, the United Nations disarmament observers in Iraq after the Gulf War.  In late July 2002 he reportedly said in the Svenska Dagbladet newspaper that during his time in this position he attempted to resist attempts by the United States to use the commission to perform espionage.  His successor as director was Richard Butler.

The journalist Andrew Cockburn reported in The First Post that Ekéus told him how the former US President Bill Clinton attempted to prevent Saddam Hussein's Iraq from being certified as free of weapons of mass destruction. Despite Ekéus' belief that Iraq was nearly certifiable as being free of such weapons, US Secretary of State Madeleine Albright announced that United Nations sanctions would not be lifted until such time as Hussein was no longer in power.

Ekéus later became Sweden's ambassador to the United States and the chairman of the board of the Stockholm International Peace Research Institute.

According to the journalist Christopher Hitchens, Ekéus  "told me that he'd been offered by Tariq Aziz in person, to his face, a bribe of a million and a half dollars to change his inspection report. That was going on throughout the entire process. Rolf wouldn't, of course, agree to take it, but if they were asking him, it means they were asking everybody." The story has also been covered by The Telegraph.

In January 2000, Ekéus was nominated to head the UN Monitoring, Verification and Inspections Commission (UNMOVIC), charged with investigating allegations that Iraq possessed weapons of mass destruction. But Ekéus' name failed to receive the approval of the UN Security Council, due to the opposition of France, Russia and China, and so Hans Blix was appointed instead.

Ekéus was High Commissioner on National Minorities at the OSCE from 2001 till 2007, as well as on the board of directors for the Nuclear Threat Initiative (NTI). Since 2005, Ekéus has been a Commissioner of the International Commission on Missing Persons (ICMP). He is also Member of the Supervisory Council of the International Luxembourg Forum on Preventing Nuclear Catastrophe, a not-for-profit organisation uniting leading experts on non-proliferation of nuclear weapons, materials and delivery vehicles.

References

External links
 OSCE Profile
 

1935 births
Living people
People from Kristinehamn
People from Kristinehamn Municipality
Organization for Security and Co-operation in Europe
Ambassadors of Sweden to the United States